Calyptrocalyx amoenus is a palm species in the family Arecaceae, and is native to Papua New Guinea and to the Indonesian part of New Guinea, Western New Guinea.

Taxonomy
Calyptrocalyx amoenus was first described in 2001 by John Dowe and Michael Ferrero. The species epithet, amoenus, derives from the Latin for "delightful", amoena.

References

External links
Calyptrocalyx amoenus at PalmWeb

amoenus
Flora of New Guinea
Plants described in 2001
Taxa named by Michael D. Ferrero
Taxa named by John Leslie Dowe